John Bemister (1815 – December 19, 1892) was a merchant and political figure in Newfoundland. He represented Conception Bay from 1852 to 1855 and Bay de Verde from 1855 to 1869 in the Newfoundland and Labrador House of Assembly.

He was born in Carbonear, the son of William Willis Bemister and Ann Howell. He was first employed as clerk and bookkeeper in his father's firm and then operated branches in New Perlican on Trinity Bay and in Carbonear. In 1839, he married Jane Taylor. He was named to the Executive Council in 1861 and became receiver general in 1862. After he was reelected in 1869, he resigned his seat to become sheriff for the Northern District, retiring in 1891. Bemister died in Harbour Grace the following year.

References 

Members of the Newfoundland and Labrador House of Assembly
1815 births
1892 deaths
People from Carbonear
Newfoundland Colony people